Igor Nikolaevich Markin (born 1967) is a Russian entrepreneur. In 2007, he founded a private art museum in Moscow.

References

Russian art collectors
1967 births
Living people
Date of birth missing (living people)
21st-century Russian businesspeople